Simos Stogiannou Ioannidis was a Slavophone Greek revolutionary of the Macedonian Struggle known as well by the nom de guerre Armenskiotis.

Biography 

Ioannidis was born in the 1880s in Armenskon of Florina, then Ottoman Empire (now Alona, Greece). He started his armed actions by joining the armed group of Kottas as his adjutant and participating in the Ilinden–Preobrazhenie Uprising. He later joined the group of Pavlos Melas, assisting him and other chieftains like Efthymios Kaoudis and Georgios Tsontos who did not know the region well, acting in the region of Pelister. He set up his own armed group in 1906 cooperating with Pavlos Rakovitis, acting in the region of Florina. 

He participated as a volunteer in both Balkan Wars, and notably in the battle which led to the extermination of Vasil Chekalarov.

In 1957, the village of Motesnica in Florina was renamed to Simos Ioannidis in his honour.

References 

Year of birth uncertain
Year of death unknown
Slavic speakers of Greek Macedonia
Greek Macedonians
Greek people of the Macedonian Struggle
People from Florina